Mircea Alexandru Țîrlea (born 28 March 2000) is a Romanian professional footballer who plays as a right-back for Spanish club Gimnàstic de Tarragona.

Club career

Early career
Born in Alcalá de Henares, Community of Madrid to Romanian parents, Țîrlea joined Real Madrid's La Fábrica in 2010, aged ten, from hometown side RSD Alcalá. On 26 July 2019, after finishing his formation, he was loaned to Segunda División B side Salamanca CF UDS for one year.

Țîrlea made his senior debut on 25 August 2019, coming on as a second-half substitute for Martín Galván in a 3–1 home win over Arenas Club de Getxo. A backup to Javier Carpio, he featured in 16 matches during the campaign as it was curtailed due to the COVID-19 pandemic.

Alavés
On 27 July 2020, Țîrlea moved to Deportivo Alavés and was assigned to the reserves also in the third division. He scored his first senior goal the following 31 January, netting the B's second goal in a 2–4 home loss against Racing de Santander.

Țîrlea made his first-team debut on 14 December 2021, starting in a 1–2 away loss against Linares Deportivo in the season's Copa del Rey. He made his La Liga debut four days later, replacing Martín Aguirregabiria in a 0–2 away loss against Rayo Vallecano.

Gimnàstic
On 19 July 2022, Țîrlea signed a one-year deal with Primera Federación side Gimnàstic de Tarragona.

Personal life
Țîrlea's father, Mircea Nicolae, is a football coach.

Career statistics

Club

References

External links

Real Madrid official profile

2000 births
Living people
People from Alcalá de Henares
Spanish people of Romanian descent
Romanian footballers
Spanish footballers
Footballers from the Community of Madrid
Association football defenders
La Liga players
Segunda División B players
Tercera Federación players
Real Madrid Castilla footballers
Salamanca CF UDS players
Deportivo Alavés players
Deportivo Alavés B players
Gimnàstic de Tarragona footballers
Romania youth international footballers
Romania under-21 international footballers